Frederick William Hervey, 1st Marquess of Bristol (2 October 1769 – 15 February 1859), styled Lord Hervey between 1796 and 1803 and known as The Earl of Bristol between 1803 and 1826, was a British peer.

Biography

Early life
Frederick William Hervey was born on 2 October 1769, the son of Frederick Hervey, 4th Earl of Bristol and Bishop of Derry, and his wife, Elizabeth née Davers. He was the younger son but, as his elder brother John Hervey died during their father's lifetime, he succeeded to the title on the father's death in 1803. He also had three sisters, Lady Mary Erne, Countess Erne, Elizabeth Cavendish, Duchess of Devonshire and Louisa Jenkinson, Countess of Liverpool.

Adult life
Hervey was admitted to St John's College, Cambridge, in 1786, and was elected a Fellow of the Royal Society in 1805. In 1806 he inherited the estates of his uncle, Sir Charles Davers, 6th Baronet.

In 1826, he was created Marquess of Bristol and Earl Jermyn. He was succeeded by his son Frederick William (1800–1864), M.P. for Bury St Edmunds 1830–1859, as 2nd Marquess.

Personal life
Hervey married Elizabeth Albana (1775–1844), daughter of Clotworthy Upton, 1st Baron Templetown and Elizabeth Upton, Baroness Templetown, by whom he had two daughters and six sons:
Lady Augusta Hervey (29 December 1798 – 17 March 1880) married Frederick Charles William Seymour, son of Adm. Lord Hugh Seymour, and had six children.
Frederick Hervey, 2nd Marquess of Bristol (15 July 1800 – 30 October 1864), the great-great-great-grandfather of the present Marquess
Lady Georgiana Elizabeth Charlotte Hervey (8 September 1801 – 16 January 1869) married Rev. Hon. John Grey, son of Charles Grey, 2nd Earl Grey, and had three children.
Major Lord George Hervey (25 January 1803 – 3 February 1838)
Lord William Hervey (27 September 1805 – 6 May 1850), the great-great-grandfather of the current second in line to the marquessate
Rt. Rev. Lord Arthur Hervey, Bishop of Bath and Wells (20 August 1808 – 9 June 1894)
Lady Sophia Elizabeth Caroline Hervey (26 April 1811 – 1 October 1863)
Rev. Lord Charles Amelius Hervey (1 November 1814 – 11 April 1880), cricketer and clergyman
Lord Alfred Hervey (25 June 1816 – 15 April 1875)

Death
He died on 15 February 1859 from gout.

References

External links

1769 births
1859 deaths
Alumni of St John's College, Cambridge
Bristol, M1
UK MPs who were granted peerages
101
Frederick Hervey, 1st Marquess of Bristol
Fellows of the Royal Society
Peers of the United Kingdom created by George IV
Younger sons of earls